Malekabad (also Romanized as Malekābād) is a village in Harirud Rural District, Bujgan District, Torbat-e Jam County, Razavi Khorasan Province, Iran. At the 2006 census, its population was 436, in 89 families.

References 

Populated places in Torbat-e Jam County